Jurin Laksanawisit (born 15 March 1956) is a Thai Democrat Party politician and author of ethnic Chinese descent. He was former Minister of Public Health and Minister of Education during Abhisit Vejjajiva premiership along with member of the House of Representatives for eleven times.

Early life and family
Jurin was born in Thai Mueang District, Phang Nga Province. He began to study at the elementary level from Sirirat Wittaya School and continuing education at secondary level at Suankularb Wittayalai School, then Bachelor's degree at Faculty of Political Science, Thammasat University and master's degree for Public Administration from National Institute of Development Administration.

Political career
In the government of Abhisit Vejjajiva, he received the position of Minister of Education in the 59th Council of Ministers, which from the public opinion poll by ABAC Poll regarding the government's performance in the past year, it was found that his work was 15 years of free education, with a score of 7.28 points from the full score of 10 it is considered a satisfactory level of government.

From the case of resignation of Wittaya Kaewpharadai, Minister of Public Health make the Democratic Party Executive Committee resolved to allow him moved to a position Minister of Public Health instead the results of the public opinion survey in 2010 also found that he received the highest satisfaction rating from the Minister in the government with a score of 6.02 from the full score of 10.

In 2019, he was chosen for Democrat Party leader after resignation of Abhisit Vejjajiva for responsible in failure of 2019 Thai general election. He had previously been the deputy leader of the Democrat Party since 2003 for 16 years.

Personal life
When he was a student he was a writer in political cartoon using the pen name "UDDA" is the nickname that is often referred to today. In addition, he also a writer with a works of travel books in the Matichon Publishing Group, named "UDDA, holding a pen to travel" and was a former reporter for Matichon Newspaper.

Royal decorations 
Jurin has received the following royal decorations in the Honours System of Thailand:
  Knight Grand Cordon (Special Class) of The Most Noble Order of the Crown of Thailand
  Knight Grand Cordon (Special Class) of the Most Exalted Order of the White Elephant

References

Living people
1956 births
Jurin Laksanawisit
Jurin Laksanawisit
Jurin Laksanawisit
Jurin Laksanawisit
Jurin Laksanawisit
Jurin Laksanawisit
Jurin Laksanawisit
Jurin Laksanawisit
Jurin Laksanawisit
Jurin Laksanawisit
Jurin Laksanawisit
Jurin Laksanawisit